Ivan Marinov may refer to:
 Ivan Marinov (composer) (1928–2003), Bulgarian composer
 Ivan Marinov (canoeist) (born 1968), Bulgarian sprint canoer